Andrew Geoffrey Lyne  (born 13 July 1942) is a British physicist. Lyne is Langworthy Professor of Physics in the School of Physics and Astronomy, University of Manchester, as well as an ex-director of the Jodrell Bank Observatory. Despite retiring in 2007 he remains an active researcher within the Jodrell Bank Pulsar Group.  Lyne was educated at The Portsmouth Grammar School, the Royal Naval School, Tal Handaq, Malta and at St. John's College at the University of Cambridge (natural sciences), continuing to the University of Manchester for a PhD in Radio Astronomy. Lyne writes that he is "mostly interested in finding and understanding radio pulsars in all their various forms and with their various companions. Presently, I am most occupied with the development of new multibeam search systems at  Jodrell  and Parkes, in order to probe deeper into the Galaxy, particularly for millisecond pulsars, young pulsars and any that might be in binary systems."

Claimed pulsar planet
In 1991, Andrew Lyne and Matthew Bailes reported that they had discovered a pulsar orbited by a planetary companion; this would have been the first planet detected around another star.  However, after this was announced, the group went back and checked their work, and found that they had not properly removed the effects of the Earth's motion around the Sun from their analysis, and, when the calculations were redone correctly, the pulse variations that led to their conclusions disappeared, and that there was in fact no planet around PSR 1829-10.  When Lyne announced the retraction of his results at a meeting of the American Astronomical Society, he received thunderous applause from his scientific colleagues for having the intellectual integrity and the courage to admit this error publicly.

Double pulsar
In 2003, Lyne and his team discovered the first binary system found in which both components were pulsed neutron stars.  Lyne's colleague Richard Manchester called the PSR J0737-3039 system a "fantastic natural laboratory" for studying specialized effects of the General Theory of Relativity.
Other recent work that Lyne has undertaken includes research on the globular cluster at 47 Tucanae, whose dense stellar population acts as a nursery for millisecond and binary pulsars.

See also

 Pulsar planets
 Hypothetical planet

References

1942 births
Living people
People educated at The Portsmouth Grammar School
Scientists from Portsmouth
British physicists
21st-century British astronomers
Fellows of the Royal Society
Academics of the University of Manchester
20th-century British astronomers